Severe Tropical Storm Conson, known in the Philippines as Typhoon Jolina, was a strong tropical cyclone that impacted the central Philippines and Vietnam during the 2021 Pacific typhoon season. It formed as a tropical depression over the Pacific Ocean on September 5, 2021. As it formed within the Philippine Area of Responsibility, the Philippine Atmospheric, Geophysical, and Astronomical Services Administration (PAGASA) named the storm Jolina. Over the next day, it intensified into a tropical storm and was named Conson by the Japan Meteorological Agency (JMA). As the storm neared Samar Island, it intensified into a severe tropical storm, and later into a typhoon according to the PAGASA prior to its first landfall in Eastern Samar. The storm retained its strength as it crossed Visayas and later Calabarzon before weakening over Manila Bay prior to its final landfall in Bataan. It subsequently emerged into the South China Sea where it struggled to reintensify further. It then weakened into a tropical depression just offshore of Vietnam before moving ashore near Da Nang. It then rapidly weakened before dissipating on September 13.

The National Disaster Risk Reduction and Management Council in the Philippines reported 20 deaths, 23 injuries and 12 missing individuals. Agricultural and infrastructural damages in the Philippines are estimated at ₱1.59 billion (US$31.8 million).

Meteorological history 

At that time, multispectral animated satellite imagery revealed a low-level circulation center with cloud lines circling along the feature. The system was also in an area conducive for further development, with poleward outflow, favorable wind shear, and  sea surface temperatures. Over the next few hours, it gained organization as it remained stationary. At 18:00 UTC that day, the Japan Meteorological Agency upgraded the system to a tropical depression, followed simultaneously with the PAGASA's designation of the storm as Tropical Depression Jolina as it was under the agency's area of responsibility. This made the storm the tenth tropical cyclone in the region for the season. Meanwhile, the JTWC issued a Tropical Cyclone Formation Alert (TCFA) at 23:30 UTC as a circulation was now evident along the system and an organizing convective band to its south-southeast.

The same agency further upgraded the storm to a tropical depression on the next day as it further consolidated, with a persistent area of thunderstorms over an obscured low level circulation center (LLCC). Moving northwestward under the periphery of a subtropical ridge to the northeast, its organization continued to improve with an eye feature developing and at 06:00 UTC that day, the depression strengthened to a tropical storm according to the estimates of JMA and PAGASA, with the former naming it Conson. The JTWC did the same, three hours later. At 09:00 UTC (17:00 PHT), the PAGASA reported that the system further intensified to a severe tropical storm while nearing Samar Island. Over the next hours, its convection further expanded to the east from the southeast and as a result the JMA upgraded the system as well, two hours later. It subsequently intensified to a typhoon, prior to landfall over Hernani, Eastern Samar at 13:00 UTC (22:00 PHT). Conson then traversed Visayas, making additional landfalls in Daram, Santo Niño, Almagro, and Tagapul-an in Samar. The system continued consolidating while over Samar which allowed it to form a small microwave eye.

The following day, it made another landfall in Dimasalang, Masbate (2:00 UTC). Land interaction while the storm was above Masbate slightly weakened Conson as its LLCC became ragged. Traversing the Sibuyan Sea allowed Conson to briefly form a well-defined radar eye while maintaining strength. The system then made another landfall in Torrijos, Marinduque. On September 8, the storm made another landfall in San Juan, Batangas. Despite interaction with land in South Luzon, the system maintained strength while traversing Calabarzon. It then weakened as its LLCC became disorganized over Manila Bay, with the PAGASA downgrading it into a tropical storm. Conson made its last landfall in the Philippines in Mariveles, Bataan at 09:00 UTC (17:00 PHT). It later strengthened to a severe tropical storm once again at 12:00 UTC before emerging into the South China Sea, about three hours later.

The system proceeded to track westward, struggling to consolidate further. Conson retained its strength under a marginally favorable environment with moderate vertical wind shear and warm sea surface temperatures that persisted over the South China Sea the following day. As it continued tracking westward on September 10, however, high vertical wind shear exposed its LLCC, weakening the storm. Conson later regained some of its strength as it organized and regained a defined LLCC in the early hours of September 11, however this was short-lived as it had later become exposed again due to wind shear. As a result of this, the JMA downgraded the system to a tropical storm at 12:00 UTC on that day and further, with the JTWC reporting that Conson further degraded to a tropical depression at 18:00 UTC and 02:00 UTC that day and on September 12. Remaining weak and exposed, the storm stalled near Quảng Ngãi Province in south-central Vietnam under a weak steering pattern of three ridges. At 21:00 UTC, the JTWC issued its final bulletin on the storm, indicating that Conson already made landfall near Da Nang and it rapidly weakened overland. Meanwhile, the JMA tracked the system until it fully dissipated on September 13 at 18:00 UTC.

Preparations

Philippines 
Upon the system's designation as a tropical depression, the PAGASA raised Tropical Cyclone Wind Signals for Eastern Visayas and the extreme tip of Mindanao as well as the Bicol Region and some areas of Calabarzon and Mimaropa. As the system developed into a typhoon, portions of Samar and Eastern Samar were placed under Signal #3.

The Philippine Coast Guard (PCG) suspended sea trips in the northern tip of Mindanao as early as September 6. The PCG also suspended trips in Eastern Samar, Capiz, Negros Occidental, and the Bicol Region on September 7. 2,500 passengers were stranded in sea ports around Luzon and Visayas by evening. Flights from Manila to Tacloban and Legazpi Airport (and vice versa) were cancelled on September 7 due to inclement weather. On September 8, flights from Manila to Davao, Puerto Princesa, Singapore, Abu Dhabi and Taipei (and vice versa) were also cancelled, along with flights from Japan and Guam to Manila (and vice-versa).

Before and during the storm, classes were suspended in 313 municipalities and work was suspended in 320 municipalities. Classes in all levels for September 7 were suspended in the entire island of Samar including Catbalogan, the entire province of Albay, and in the cities of Tacloban and Ormoc in Leyte. Classes in all levels for September 8 were suspended in the entire provinces of Cavite, Quezon and Laguna. Including in the cities of Antipolo, San Juan, Taguig. Government work was also suspended in Laguna and Quezon. Ateneo de Manila University and University of Santo Tomas also suspended classes for September 8. Preemptive evacuations began in the lower Bicol Region by September 7. Manila and Quezon City began evacuating families on September 8. A total of 11,062 individuals were preemptively evacuated.

Vietnam 
Due to Conson's approach in the country, over 500,000 soldiers were released and put on standby as its government prepared emergency plans to ride out the storm. Many ships and vessels were also instructed to stay on ports. Health Ministry Tuoi Tre claimed that individuals living in areas that are under coronavirus lockdowns had to be evacuated to safer places and health regulations had to be enforced. 100 to 200 millimeters with isolated 250 millimeters of rain were forecasted for the country. Roofs of houses in Liên Chiểu District, Da Nang were secured as a precaution while boats on Thọ Quang were moved onshore. Classes across the province were also canceled and 14 families on Hội An were moved to evacuation shelters due to the storm. Four reservoirs in Hà Tĩnh also released their waters as a safety procedure and the Mekong River's water level were seen to increase due to the storm.

Impact

Philippines 
Conson caused widespread flooding in Luzon and Visayas. Flooding was reported in the regions of Central Luzon, Calabarzon, Mimaropa, Bicol, Western Visayas, Central Visayas and Eastern Visayas. Rough seas also prevailed during Conson's approach to the country. As of September 14, the National Disaster Risk Reduction and Management Council in the Philippines reported 19 deaths, 24 injuries and 5 missing individuals. 313,399 persons were affected by the storm — 29,832 of which were displaced from their homes.

The Metropolitan Manila Development Authority reported floods in Manila, Navotas, Mandaluyong, Masbate, Tacloban and Malabon.  In Miagao, Iloilo, flash floods destroyed 241 hectares of rice after major rivers in the town overflowed. Rains from Conson also submerged rice fields in Libertad, Antique and destroyed a spillway in San Francisco, Quezon. Water levels in the Ipo Dam reached its spilling level of 101 meters due to the heavy rain, alerting areas near the Angat River of possible flooding. Bustos Dam and Angat Dam, both also impounding Angat River, neared their spilling levels in the morning of September 8.

15,790 houses were damaged in various regions around the country — of which the majority are only partially affected. The Office of Civil Defense in Bicol reported at least ₱13.7 million in damages to fishing boats and equipment. Five transmission lines in Eastern Visayas failed, affecting 286,243 power consumers and causing blackouts in Tacloban, as well as the entire provinces of Samar and Eastern Samar.

The Philippine Coast Guard, Philippine National Police and Ormoc City authorities rescued individuals trapped in floodwaters in the area starting on the night of September 6 until the next morning. A fishing boat capsized in Hamtic, Antique as it was swept out of the sea by the storm, injuring one of the crew members. Another boat capsized in Cataingan, where six fishermen had to be rescued. 50 fishermen from the provinces of Leyte and Samar were rescued as strong waves hit various vessels in Eastern Visayas. Conson left 10 dead and 9 missing in Eastern Visayas. A fishing boat capsized in Catbalogan, killing one crew member. The seven other crew members were later rescued. A vessel sank in Marinduque, leading to one person drowning. A man fell into a river in Placer, Masbate, and was later found dead. In addition, a resort worker in Batangas was killed in a landslide. Nine individuals were injured while one was reported missing in Eastern Samar. Another two were injured in Atimonan when a cargo truck fell into a ravine after the vehicle lost control.

Vietnam
Although Conson rapidly weakened before making landfall on the Vietnamese coast, the storm and its rainband still produced heavy rainfall and winds. Bình Tân (Quảng Ngãi) recorded a whopping  of rain. Two people were killed by flooding. Another 23 ship crews from 3 vessels were also killed, in the waters off of Bach Long Vy island and Ha Tinh. Agriculture damages on the island of Lý Sơn is estimated to be about one hundred billion VND ($4.3 million).

Retirement 
On March 21, 2022, the PAGASA chose the name Jacinto as its replacement for the 2025 season.

Notes

See also 

 Weather of 2021
 Tropical cyclones in 2021
 Other tropical cyclones named Jolina
 Other tropical cyclones named Conson
 Typhoon Ketsana
Typhoon Xangsane – a 2006 typhoon that took an almost similar path while traversing through the Philippines.
 Tropical Storm Nock-ten (2011)

References

External links 

 JMA General Information of Severe Tropical Storm Conson (2113) from Digital Typhoon
 JMA Best Track Data of Tropical Storm Conson (2113) 
 JMA Best Track Data (Graphics) of Severe Tropical Storm Conson (2113)
 JTWC Best Track Data of Typhoon 18W (Conson)
 18W.CONSON from the U.S. Naval Research Laboratory

2021 disasters in the Philippines
2021 Pacific typhoon season
Tropical cyclones in 2021
Retired Philippine typhoon names
Typhoons in the Philippines
September 2021 events in Asia
Typhoons in Vietnam
2021 in Vietnam
Western Pacific severe tropical storms